Europe is generally characterized by a temperate climate. Most of Western Europe has an Oceanic climate, in the Köppen climate classification, featuring cool to warm summers and cool winters with frequent overcast skies. Southern Europe has a distinctively Mediterranean climate, which features warm to hot, dry summers and cool to mild winters and frequent sunny skies. Central-eastern Europe is classified as having a humid continental climate, which features warm to hot summers and cold winters.

Parts of the central European plains have a hybrid oceanic/continental climate. Four seasons occur in most of Europe away from the Mediterranean. The coastal lowlands of the Mediterranean Basin have more of a wet winter and dry summer season pattern, the winter season extends from October to February while the summer season is mainly noticeable in the dry months where precipitation can, in some years, become extremely scarce. A very small area in the continent features the desert climate, which exists in the south-eastern coasts of Spain making them the only places in Europe that have an arid climate.

Gulf Stream

The climate of western Europe is strongly conditioned by the Gulf Stream, which keeps mild air (for the latitude) over Northwestern Europe in the winter months, especially in Ireland, the United Kingdom and coastal Norway. In terms of monthly sunshine averages, much of temperate Europe sees considerably less than the northern United States and eastern Asia.  

The climate of Western Europe is milder in comparison to other areas of the same latitude around the globe due to the influence of the Gulf Stream. Western Europe is at the same latitude as parts Canada and Russia, thus solar insulation is weak much of the year. Mediterranean waters are not as deep as the large oceans, allowing it to become a heat storage tempering winters along its coastlines, but because the Atlantic Ocean is largely influenced by the gulf stream, this effect is reduced when compared to that of the Atlantic waters. The Gulf Stream is nicknamed "Europe's central heating", because it makes Europe's climate warmer and wetter than it would otherwise be.

Compared to areas located in the higher middle latitudes, parts of western Europe have mild winters and higher annual temperatures (though summers are cooler than locations at the same latitude). Berlin, Germany; Calgary, Canada; and Irkutsk, in the Asian part of Russia, lie on around the same latitude; January temperatures in Berlin average around 8 °C (15 °F) higher than those in Calgary (although Calgary sits 1200m higher in altitude), and they are almost 22 °C (40 °F) higher than average temperatures in Irkutsk.

This difference is even larger on the northern part of the continent. The January average in Brønnøysund, Norway, is almost 15 °C warmer than the January average in Nome, Alaska, both towns are situated upwind on the west coast of the continents at 65°N, and as much as 42 °C warmer than the January average in Yakutsk which is actually slightly further south. Further south the oceanic climate of Europe compares thermally to North America, at around 48°N Rennes, France has about an equal average temperature throughout the year to Seattle, Washington, although the latter has drier summers with much wetter winters.

Within mainland Spain, the arid climate appears predominantly in Almería.

Temperature

Most of Europe sees seasonal temperatures consistent with temperate climates in other parts of the world, though summers north of the Mediterranean Sea are cooler than most temperate climates experience in summer (for example summers in the temperate sector of the northern United States are much hotter in summer than Europe). Among the cities with a population over 100,000 people in Europe, the coldest winters are mostly found in Russia, with daily highs in winter averaging , while the mildest winters in the continent are in southern Portugal, southern Spain, in Sicily (Italy) and southern Greek islands such as Crete, Rhodes, Karpathos and Kasos.

The hottest summers of the continent occur in cities and towns of the hinterland of southern Spain and southern Greece.
 and  respectively.

Tornadoes 
The Netherlands has the highest average number of recorded tornadoes per area of any country in the world (more than 20, or 0.0005 per km2), annually), followed by the UK (around 33, or 0.0001 per km2), per year), but most are small and cause minor damage. In absolute number of events, ignoring area, the UK experiences more tornadoes than any other European country, excluding waterspouts. Europe uses its own tornado scale, known as the TORRO scale, which ranges from a T0 for extremely weak tornadoes to T11 for the most powerful known tornadoes.

Climate change

See also 
 Arctic oscillation
 North Atlantic oscillation
 Climate change in Europe
 2003 European heat wave
 2018 European heat wave
 List of European cities by average temperature
 List of cities in Europe by precipitation

References

Further reading